Atte Petteri Ohtamaa (born 6 November 1987) is a Finnish professional ice hockey defenceman for Oulun Kärpät of the Liiga.

Playing career
Ohtamaa's youth team was Nivala Cowboys before he transferred to Oulun Kärpät at the Junior B level.

On 27 August 2019, Ohtamaa joined HC Lugano of the National League (NL) on a two-month contract until 3 November 2019. He was brought in as their fifth import player in case of injuries. Ohtamaa played 17 games with Lugano (3 points) before being released on 2 November 2019. He was then loaned to Kazakh-based KHL club, Barys Nur-Sultan, for the remainder of the season.

As a free agent on 1 May 2020, Ohtamaa opted to continue in the KHL, securing a one-year contract with Russian club Lokomotiv Yaroslavl.

International play

Ohtamaa was named to the Finland men's national ice hockey team for competition at the 2014 IIHF World Championship.

Career statistics

Regular season and playoffs

International

Awards and honors
 Won the Finnish Champion (Kanada-malja) 2x: 2007–08, 2013–14.
 SM-Liiga, Runner-up 3x: 2008–09, 2015–16, 2018–19
 KHL, (Gagarin Cup) 1x: 2017–18

References

External links

1987 births
Living people
Finnish ice hockey defencemen
Ak Bars Kazan players
Barys Nur-Sultan players
Finnish expatriate ice hockey players in Kazakhstan
Finnish expatriate ice hockey players in Russia
Finnish expatriate ice hockey players in Switzerland
Jokerit players
Lokomotiv Yaroslavl players
HC Lugano players
Oulun Kärpät players
People from Nivala
Ice hockey players at the 2018 Winter Olympics
Ice hockey players at the 2022 Winter Olympics
Olympic ice hockey players of Finland
Medalists at the 2022 Winter Olympics
Olympic gold medalists for Finland
Olympic medalists in ice hockey
Sportspeople from North Ostrobothnia
21st-century Finnish people